El Mundo Real (Spanish for The Real World) is the Mexican/Latin American version of MTV's reality television series The Real World. The series is produced by Bunim/Murray Productions and MTV Studios, being part of the new distribution deal for the franchise with Facebook Watch, which includes the revival of the American series, together with the Thailand-based season. The series was announced on October 8, 2018, and the series debuted on June 13, 2019. The series was primarily filmed in Mexico City, Mexico.

It's not the first time the franchise (not including spin-off The Challenge) has filmed in Mexico, as the American version's twenty-second season took place in the country just ten years prior to this version's debut.

Set primarily in Mexico City, the show features 7 strangers living together in a house located in a centric neighborhood of the city where their lives were taped between March and May 2019, with the show debuting weeks later. Casting calls for this season were opened in late 2018.

Episode distribution 
Similar to both Atlanta & Bangkok seasons, under the new distribution, daily drops are uploaded Monday through Wednesday on the official Facebook Watch pages for each of the three franchises, with these daily bits being uploaded at around noon (UTC-5).

The weekly episodes premiere on Thursdays at 9PM (UTC-5). This season is composed of 12 episodes.

Cast

Episodes

References

The Real World (TV series)
2019 Mexican television series debuts
2019 Mexican television series endings